Niederriedsee (or Stausee Niederried) is a reservoir formed by the Niederried dam on the Aar River in the Canton of Berne, Switzerland. It is named after the nearby village Niederried bei Kallnach.

See also
List of lakes of Switzerland

References

Lakes of the canton of Bern
Niederried
Ramsar sites in Switzerland
RNiederriedsee